Krishna Prasad Poudel  is a Nepali politician belonging to NepaL Communist Party Uml. He is also member of Rastriya Sabha and was elected under open category.

References 

Living people
Nepali Congress politicians from Bagmati Province
21st-century Nepalese politicians
Year of birth missing (living people)
Members of the National Assembly (Nepal)